Karunguzhi is a town in Chengalpattu district in the Indian state of Tamil Nadu.

History
the town of Karunguzhi, with an interruption between 1825 and 1835, was the first capital and administrative headquarters were transferred to Kanchipuram. In 1859 the capital Saidapet, now a neighbourhood in the city of Chennai, was made the administrative headquarters of the district.

It acted as the capital of chingleput district under Madras presidency from 1793-1825 and from 1835-1859.

Demographics 
 India census, Karunguzhi had a population of 11,265. Males constitute 50% of the population and females 50%. Karunguzhi has an average literacy rate of 68%, higher than the national average of 59.5%: male literacy is 75%, and female literacy is 61%. In Karunguzhi, 12% of the population is under 6 years of age.

There are several tourist attractions in the area. "Vedanthangal Bird Sanctuary" is one of the most famous bird sanctuaries in India. It is 8 km from Karunguzhi.

An ancient fort built by a Pallava emperor is also located here. There are two mountains in Karunguzhi. One is a Renganathar mountain, in Malaipalayam: It is nearly 700 metres high and a temple to Lord Vishnu is on the top. The other mountain is in Karunguzhi forest. In the middle of the forest is a temple to Siva.

Nearby is the Lord Gnanagereeswarar temple, built nearly 1000 years ago.

Madurantakam town is 3 km from Karunguzhi. The second biggest lake in Tamil Nadu is Madurantakam lake.

References

External links

Cities and towns in Chengalpattu district